Anna Maria Marconi is a fictional scientist appearing in American comic books published by Marvel Comics. She was initially depicted as a love interest of Spider-Man, notably during the time when his body was taken over by Doctor Octopus's mind. She has since been depicted as a close friend to Peter Parker after he regains his mind.

Publication history
Anna Maria Marconi first appeared in The Superior Spider-Man #5 (May 2013) and was created by Dan Slott and Giuseppe Camuncoli.

The basis for Anna Maria Marconi came from Slott's desire to introduce a character that could cause some friction in Peter's personal life. He found this difficult to pull off as he couldn't find any reason why a character like Betty Brant or Aunt May could be bigoted or racist. Rather than having anyone of them have such a fierce trait, he had May's opinion of Peter dating Anna Maria be that of concern:

He also found it relieving that Peter's mind was taken over by Otto Octavius as he felt that the character was more open-minded than Peter:

Fictional character biography
Anna Maria Marconi is a young woman with dwarfism who attends Empire State University. At the time when his mind was in Peter Parker's body, Doctor Octopus visits her to become his tutor for his physics class so he can earn his doctorate. The two share great admiration for each other and the next day, "Otto" pulls a rather brutal prank on a group of bullies that were taunting her for her size. The two set up a date together that ends with "Peter" saving Anna Maria from dry ice and kissing her. However, she too falls under the same worry umbrella as many of Peter's friends and family due to his frequent absences. Later, Anna Maria accepts "Otto's" offer to join Parker Industries and afterwards, successfully helps him earn his doctorate.

Anna Maria eventually meets Aunt May who despite her friendliness, causes some concern when she asks about her height. She later confides in "Peter" that she feels that their evening together was her fault because she had hurt the relationship between him and May. During the events of Goblin Nation, Anna Maria was kidnapped by the Menace who had deduced that "Peter" was really Otto. Norman Osborn as the newly christened Goblin King held her hostage to lure his Superior Spider-Man form out. However, Otto had given up his mind and let Peter take back control of Spider-Man and he successfully rescued Anna Maria. She reveals to Peter that she had deduced that he was Spider-Man and that "he" planned on proposing to her, but is shocked to learn that Otto Octavius was the one she was in love with. After baking him cookies (baking helps her think), she leaves to clear her head. She soon meets back up with Peter at Parker Industries to help him with some of Otto's work and continues to help Peter on a platonic basis.

Anna Maria still continues to worry for Peter, not necessarily due to his safety, but because his absences have caused some to lose faith in the company. To remedy this Peter promotes Anna Maria to ensure safety with the company. At the time when Aunt May asked Peter and Anna Maria if they are coming over for dinner, Anna called up Peter at the time when he as Spider-Man was fighting Iguana at the Central Park Zoo where the phone call annoyed Iguana. Anna Maria also patches up her past conflict with May, who until recently did not know that she and Peter had broken up. It is also revealed that she and Sajani Jaffrey, a co-worker at Parker Industries, have been working on nano-tech research, mostly due to Sajani feeling that Peter keeps too many secrets to himself. Anna Maria is later sent to work at Parker Industries' European Division under Sajani. Unbeknownst to Anna Maria, Sajani had infused Living Brain with the consciousness of Otto Octavius which had the caused the robot to act clingy around her. Later, she gets Sajani's position after she is fired by Peter for conspiring against him.

Since then, Anna Maria and Living Brain have been acting as something akin to Spider-Man's sidekicks, helping him whenever he needs them. Slowly, Living Brain's Otto Octavius persona becomes more and more active as he grows jealous of Peter and fellow subordinate Aiden Blain's closeness to Anna Maria. Otto soon enacts his plan by getting rid of Aiden and then pretending to be faulty by attacking Peter.

During the "Dead No More: The Clone Conspiracy" storyline, Anna Maria helped Peter battle Jackal who was actually Ben Reilly. When Horizon University was attacked by Rhino and the female Electro, they retrieve Gwen Stacy's clone and Kaine as Anna Maria Marconi also volunteers to come with since she's studied both Kaine and the drug. Anna Maria is brought into the lab and becomes uncomfortable when Doctor Octopus starts appealing toward his love interest. When Spider-Man makes it to the lab amongst the clones starting to break down, Anna Maria tells him that she's invented an inverse frequency that can fix most of the problem. Doctor Octopus fights Jackal to allow Peter and Anna Maria the time to transmit the frequency. After the frequency is broadcast, Peter and Anna check the building and see that Jackal, Doctor Octopus, and Gwen Stacy have been reduced to dust. Anna notes that the "Proto Clone," or "Ultimate Template," appears missing. They come back to the front to check on Kaine and Spider-Woman of Earth-65's status.

At the conclusion of the "Go Down Swinging" storyline, Anna Maria was present at Horizon University where a clean-slated Superior Octopus, under the alias of Dr. Elliot Tolliver, applies for a job. Anna Maria acted suspicious around him.

During the "Spider-Geddon" storyline, Anna Maria runs into Dr. Elliot Tolliver where she comments that she might've met him somewhere before. Later in the cafeteria, she watches the footage on her cell phone of Superior Octopus' fight with Night Shift.

Anna Maria Marconi discovers that Elliot Tolliver is Otto Octavius. She goes to his lab. During an argument, she summons a rebuilt Living Brain, who has been upgraded with digital components, to fight him. But when news footage reveals that Terrax has arrived on San Francisco, Anna lets Elliot go to fight him. She then helps Elliot and the Night Shift in defeating Terrax, by preparing and sending a device, which Superior Spider-Man used to absorb some of Terrax's cosmic powers. After Superior Spider-Man defeats Terrax, Anna takes him to the medical room at Horizon University. She then proposes a deal to Elliot: she'll help him maintain his path to heroism and won't turn him to the authorities if he doesn't become a criminal again. Anna then helps Elliot become more humble and connect to the people, while he helps with searching and rescuing survivors. Anna then gives Elliot dating advice after he asks Dr. Emma Hernandez, a co-worker at Horizon University, on a date. She then shows up at Elliot's apartment, complaining about Elliot's mistakes during his date, after Superior Spider-Man and Doctor Strange defeated Master Pandemonium, who possessed the people of San Francisco, where they find Emma, who was also possessed but returned to normal.

Anna then tries to understand why Elliot left during a ceremony, where he was being given the key to the city by the mayor for his heroic actions during the "War of the Realms" storyline. When a news report reveals that Superior Spider-Man is Otto Octavius, Anna, along with Emma and Max Modell, helps him investigate who spread the news. They later discover that the alternate version of Norman Osborn from Earth-44145 was responsible for the leak until Norman appears at the lab and attacks Elliot, blowing up the lab in the process. Rescue crews work to save those caught in the explosion. As Max Modell and Emma Hernandez are loaded onto the ambulances, Anna Maria Marconi tells Superior Spider-Man that she will go to the hospital to keep an eye on them. As he goes to look for the Night Shift members that are still loyal to him, Superior Spider-Man asks her to keep James Martin safe. Awakening in the infirmary following a disastrous fight with Spider-Man of Earth-44145 who made off with James, Superior Spider-Man learns from Anna Maria that James' aunt and uncle are in shock, Skein and Dansen are recovering form their injuries, and Emma is in a medically-induced coma while Digger is still living with his head detached while asking for a staple gun. Superior Spider-Man tells Anna Maria that he can't call Spider-Man or the Avengers without endangering James. With no other choice, Superior Spider-Man uses a signal move he learned from Doctor Strange to call Mephisto who states that Spider-Man of Earth-44145 is out of his jurisdiction. Superior Spider-Man asks Mephisto to restore him to the man he once was for a day so that he can fight Spider-Man of Earth-44145. While Mephisto states that he either has or doesn't have his soul, he does have a counter-offer that will restore his body without disease, physical or mental, and the taint of Peter Parker. As Superior Spider-Man tells Anna that there is no other option, he expects Mephisto to uphold his end of the bargain.

A.I. version
When Superior Spider-Man was sent to the year 2099, he encountered Gabriel O'Hara, the brother of Miguel O'Hara and the Spider-Man 2099. In order to contact Miguel and return to his proper time, Gabriel aids Superior Spider-Man in creating an A.I. named Anna, who is made to resemble Anna Maria Marconi. Spider-Man has since ceased using her since the beginning of "Dead No More: The Clone Conspiracy" storyline.

In other media

Television
 Anna Maria Marconi appears in Marvel's Spider-Man, voiced by Katrina Kemp who was born with dwarfism. While the prejudice of her size from the comics is intact, this version is an assistant chemistry teacher at Midtown High School. After re-enrolling in Midtown High School, Otto Octavius (via Peter Parker's body) meets her and accepts her help in a sponsorship proposal to Alchemax so that they can help make Midtown High be equal to schools like Horizon High. When it came to Anna Maria sponsorship proposal meeting with Alchemax's CEO Tiberius Stone, the meeting is crashed by Cloak and Dagger who want revenge on Tiberius for the experiments that Alchemax did to them. Superior Spider-Man arrives to fight them while mentioning his knowledge that Alchemax experiments on the innocence for their corporate gain. After striking Dagger with a chair and being advised by Superior Spider-Man to flee, Anna Maria tells Tiberius that she is withdrawing the sponsorship proposal to Alchemax as she leaves the auditorium. In the episode "Superior", Anna Maria is taken hostage by a reverse-engineered Venom as a bargaining chip to convince Octavius to reunite Peter's consciousness and body, discovering Spider-Man's secret identity in the process. After Peter is restored to his former self by Octavius and defeats Venom, he explains to Anna Maria that the Spider-Man she knew before was Otto. After Peter successfully transfers Octavius' mind back into his comatose body, Anna Maria views Octavius as a real hero. In the episodes "Brand New Day" and "The Cellar", Anna Maria remains by Octavius' side until he finally recovers from his coma and accompanies him in freeing Dagger from her cell so that she and Cloak can rescue the Avengers from another dimension that Regent had banished them to. During the multi-part season finale "Goblin War", Anna Maria assists Octavius in providing tactical support to the Spider Team during their battle with the various Goblin clans. Later in the end, she attends to Octavius' funeral, devastated over his sacrifice to save the city.

Video games
 Anna Maria Marconi appears in the mobile game Spider-Man Unlimited. This version doesn't know that Peter's mind was taken over by Otto until he tells her. Superior Spider-Man has to rescue her from Green Goblin.

References

External links
 Anna Maria Marconi at Marvel Wiki
 Anna Maria Marconi at Comic Vine

Characters created by Dan Slott
Comics characters introduced in 2013
Marvel Comics female characters
Fictional characters from New York City
Fictional characters with dwarfism
Fictional female scientists
Spider-Man characters